WPAK is a Positive Country formatted broadcast radio station licensed to Farmville, Virginia, serving Farmville, Northern Prince Edward County, Virginia, and Southern Cumberland County, Virginia. WPAK is owned by Emory F. Bearden, through licensee White Pine Enterprises, Inc.

Programming
WPAK simulcasts WRMV-LP located in Madison Heights, Virginia.

References

External links

Radio stations established in 1978
PAK
Country radio stations in the United States